Major Accident (also known as Accident) is a punk band from the North East of England.

History

Early years 
Major Accident was originally formed in late 1977 in Darlington. Their first studio recording came in the early 1980s, when they recorded a single called Terrorist Gang with the B-side "Self Appointed Hero", and an early version of Massacred Melodies, which the band re-recorded in 1981 – this became their first LP. They planned to release "Warboots" from this session and got as far as test pressings before being signed by Step Forward records, home of Chelsea, Sham 69 and the Cortinas amongst others.

The band released their first single, "Mr Nobody", with Step-Forward Records before the release of their first studio LP. A UK tour supporting Chelsea helped promote the release of the record. They had UK Independent Chart hits with singles "Fight To Win" (no. 24) and "Leaders of Tomorrow" (no. 19, featuring drummer Evo, formerly from The Angelic Upstarts and The Blood who went on to form punk influenced thrash and speed metal NWOBHM band Warfare),followed by "Respectable" (featuring "The Big G" – Garteh Jones on drums) all released on the Flicknife Records label, as was the LP A Clockwork Legion, by which time the band's name had been shortened to "Accident". A live album, Tortured Tunes – the Official Bootleg, was released in 1984, reaching no. 24 on the Uk Independent Chart. Around this time the band appeared on BBC2 playing three songs live. American label Toxic Shock released a follow-up album ...Crazy! in 1985, just before the band split up.

1996–present 
Major Accident re-formed in 1996, once again using the full name rather than just "Accident". The re-formation was accompanied by a new studio album, The Ultimate High, released on We Bite Records, with a seven-inch single, Representation Not Reality, which was released in 1999 on Upstart Productions. The band's final release was a split album with Welsh street punks Foreign Legion entitled Cry Of Legion.

Live performances followed, including a night at New York's CBGB in 2001 with a "clockwork punk" theme. The band's activity was sharply curtailed when drummer Laze was involved in a motorcycle accident. The band currently plays just two or three concerts each year.

Clockwork punks 
Major Accident popularised a punk style of dress based on the costumes worn in the 1971 film A Clockwork Orange, including bowler hats, white shirts, white trousers and black boots. Fans of the group, and sometimes members of Major Accident themselves, also occasionally wore fishtail coats, though more often they wore black leather biker jackets. The "clockwork punk" style also extended to an appreciation of Ludwig van Beethoven's music, again following the movie's protagonist. Major Accident played the composer's 9th Symphony with guitar, bass and drums in their interpretations The Glorious 9th and The March.  Little evidence of any further interest in classical music was shown from the band.

Major Accident's use of A Clockwork Orange imagery is also seen in the sleeve designs on their albums, with their early LPs, CDs and seven-inch singles using stark black and white imagery (though they began to include red after their 1996 reformation), and characters dressed in the Clockwork Orange style. Their final album in 1985 (before their reformation) ...Crazy! depicts a scene from the film, where the protagonist, Alex, is shown strapped into a laboratory chair, his eyes held open with metal clips.

Other 1970s and 1980s Clockwork punk bands include The Adicts (whose version had a more fun, circus-clown emphasis), Die Toten Hosen (who released the themed album Ein kleines bisschen Horrorschau), Blitz (who wore some of the dress later in their career) and The Violators who along with Blitz recorded on the 'No Future' record label.

Discography 
Other versions of these releases also exist on other record labels. Those listed here are the original release versions.

7 inch singles

Studio albums

Studio split album

Live album

Compilation albums

Video

Bibliography 
Burning Britain: The History of UK Punk 1980–1984 by Ian Glasper Cherry Red Books (2004).

References 

English punk rock groups
English rock music groups
Street punk groups
Underground punk scene in the United Kingdom
Musical groups established in 1977
Musical groups disestablished in 1985
Musical groups reestablished in 1996
Musical groups disestablished in 2000
Musical quartets